The Adoration of the Shepherds, in the Nativity of Jesus in art, is a scene in which shepherds are near witnesses to the birth of Jesus in Bethlehem, arriving soon after the actual birth. It is often combined in art with the Adoration of the Magi, in which case it is typically just referred to by the latter title. The Annunciation to the Shepherds, when they are summoned by an angel to the scene, is a distinct subject.

Biblical narrative
The Adoration of the Shepherds is an episode in the nativity narrative of the Gospel of Luke. Shepherds are watching their flocks by night, apparently near Bethlehem, when an angel appears to announce the good news that "today in the City of David a Saviour has been born to you; he is the Messiah, the Lord." The angelic promise is accompanied by a sign: they will find the saviour in the form of "a baby wrapped in cloths and lying in a manger." "Suddenly a great company of the heavenly host" (the Greek word used here indicates a military formation, an army) appeared and joined the angel, singing "Glory to God in the highest heaven, and peace among those of good will." 

15 When the angels had left them and gone into heaven, the shepherds said to one another, “Let us go now to Bethlehem and see this thing that has taken place, which the Lord has made known to us.” 16 So they went with haste and found Mary and Joseph, and the child lying in the manger.

The Annunciation to the shepherds which precedes the adoration forms a distinct subject in Christian art and is sometimes included in a Nativity scene as a peripheral feature (even though it occurs prior to the adoration itself), as in the 1485 scene by Domenico Ghirlandaio, where it can be seen in the upper left corner. Ghirlandaio also shows a procession of Magi about to arrive with their gifts.

In art
The scene is very commonly combined with the Adoration of the Magi, which makes for a balanced composition, as the two groups often occupy opposite sides of the image space around the central figures, and represent the theological interpretation of the episode where the two groups – Jewish and gentile – represented the peoples of the world between them. This combination is first found in the 6th century Monza ampullae made in Byzantine Palaestina Prima.

In Renaissance art, drawing on classical stories of Orpheus, the shepherds are sometimes depicted with musical instruments.  A charming but atypical miniature in the La Flora Hours in Naples shows the shepherds playing to the Infant Jesus, as a delighted Virgin Mary stands to one side.

Many artists have depicted the Adoration of the Shepherds. Famous examples include:

Correggio: Adoration of the Shepherds, Gemäldegalerie Alte Meister, Dresden
Caravaggio: Adoration of the Shepherds, Museo Regionale, Messina
Domenichino: Adoration of the Shepherds, National Gallery of Scotland, Edinburgh
Giorgione, Allendale Nativity, National Gallery of Art, Washington, D.C.
El Greco, Adoration of the Shepherds, Museo del Prado, Madrid
Le Nain brothers: Adoration of the Shepherds, National Gallery, London
Hugo van der Goes: Portinari Triptych, Galleria degli Uffizi, Florence
Lorenzo di Credi: Adoration of the Shepherds, also Uffizi
Andrea Mantegna: The Adoration of the Shepherds, Metropolitan Museum of Art, New York 
Edward Burne-Jones's stained-glass windows in Trinity Church, Boston
Giotto, in the Scrovegni Chapel, Padua
Georges de La Tour, Louvre, Paris
Bartolomé Esteban Murillo, the Hermitage Museum, Saint Petersburg
Nicolas Poussin and Rembrandt, National Gallery, London
 Poussin's painting was vandalised in 2011, along with his The Adoration of the Golden Calf.
Guido Reni, Adoration of the Shepherds, Certosa di San Martino, Naples
Martin Schongauer, Berlin
Domenico Ghirlandaio, Sassetti Chapel, Santa Trinita, Florence
Gerard van Honthorst, Wallraf-Richartz Museum, Cologne

Christmas carols
Several well-known Christmas carols mention the adoration of the shepherds. Some of these do so along the lines of urging the listener to come to Bethlehem such as the "Shepherd's Pipe Carol". The modern "Calypso Carol" has the lines "Shepherds swiftly from your stupor rise / to see the Saviour of the world," and the chorus "O now carry me to Bethlehem." "Angels We Have Heard on High" says, "Come to Bethlehem and see / Him Whose birth the angels sing."

"O Come, All Ye Faithful" ("Adeste Fideles" in the Latin version) has a verse which runs:
See how the shepherds,
Summoned to His cradle,
Leaving their flocks, draw nigh to gaze;
We too will thither
Bend our joyful footsteps.

Other carols which mention the adoration of the shepherds include "Silent Night", "What Child Is This?", "Infant Holy, Infant Lowly", "I Wonder as I Wander", and "O Come, Little Children". The German carol "Vom Himmel hoch, da komm ich her" ("From Heaven Above to Earth I Come") contains several stanzas on the subject of following the shepherds and celebrating the newborn baby. The Czech carol "Nesem vám noviny ("Come, All Ye Shepherds", in German "Kommet, ihr Hirten") concerns the adoration of the shepherds; the middle verse of Mari Ruef Hofer's English version runs:

Hasten then, hasten to Bethlehem's stall,
There to see heaven descend to us all.
With holy feeling, there humbly kneeling,
We will adore Him, bow down before Him,
Worship the King.

Biblical commentary
Roger Baxter reflects on verse 15 ("Let us go to Bethlehem..."), writing, "Observe the prompt obedience of the shepherds, and learn thence to obey with promptitude the divine inspirations. " For they came with haste. No one can see Christ slothfully," says St. Ambrose.

Venerable Bede makes a similar comment: “The shepherds hasten, for the presence of Christ must not be sought with sluggishness; and many perchance that seek Christ do not merit to find Him, because they seek Him slothfully.”

Gallery

See also
 Adoration of the Magi
 Marian art in the Catholic Church
 Nativity of Jesus in art

References

Bibliography
 Beckwith, John (1969). Early Medieval Art. Thames and Hudson. .
 
 Levey, Michael (1961). From Giotto to Cézanne. Thames and Hudson. .
 Myers, Bernard (1965, 1985). Landmarks of Western Art. Hamlyn. .

External links 
 

Gospel of Luke
 
Pastoralists